Prism is the upcoming seventeenth studio album by English ambient house duo the Orb. The album will be released on 28 April 2023 via Cooking Vinyl. It includes contributions from Youth, Violeta Vicci, Gaudi, David Harrow, Leandro Fresco, Jono Podmore and David Lofts and features vocalists Eric Von Skywalker, Andy Cain and Rachel D’arcy.

Track listing

References

The Orb albums
2023 albums
Upcoming albums